Atchison, Topeka & Santa Fe 3751 is a class 3751 4-8-4 steam locomotive built in 1927 by the Baldwin Locomotive Works in Eddystone (Philadelphia), Pennsylvania for the Atchison, Topeka & Santa Fe Railway (ATSF). No. 3751 was the first 4-8-4 steam locomotive built for the Santa Fe and was referenced in documentation as type: "Heavy Mountain", "New Mountain", or "Mountain 4-wheel trailer". No. 3751 served in passenger duties until being retired in 1953.

The locomotive was then placed on display in San Bernardino until it was restored to operating condition in 1991. It is currently located in the Central City East neighborhood of Los Angeles and has been listed on the National Register of Historic Places since 2000. It holds the distinction of being the oldest surviving 4-8-4 type steam locomotive in the world.

The locomotive is currently owned and operated by the San Bernardino Railroad Historical Society, which uses the locomotive to haul occasional mainline excursion trains. However, a federally mandated 15-year inspection put it out of service for three to four years. No. 3751's overhaul was completed in September 2022, and it returned to service that month.

History

Revenue service 
Built in May 1927 by the Baldwin Locomotive Works, No. 3751 was Baldwin's and the Santa Fe Railway's first 4-8-4 type. Tests showed that the new locomotive was 20% more efficient and powerful than the 3700 class 4-8-2 "Mountain" type steamers, which at the time were Santa Fe's most advanced steam locomotives. Santa Fe adopted the terminology "Heavy Mountain", "New Mountain", or "Mountain 4-wheel trailer" as notation for this new 4-8-4 type and continued the numbering sequence of the 3700 class Mountains by numbering the first 4-8-4 3751. 

No. 3751 was also present at the grand opening of Union Passenger Terminal in Los Angeles on May 7, 1939, pulling the Scout, one of Santa Fe's crack passenger trains as it arrived from Chicago. It was the first steam locomotive to bring a passenger train into Union Station.

In 1941, along with other 4-8-4s, 3751 received major upgrades including: (or. 73") drive wheels, a new frame, roller bearings all around, and more.

It continued to be a very reliable working locomotive until 1953, when it pulled the last regularly scheduled steam-powered passenger train on the Santa Fe to run between Los Angeles and San Diego on August 25; this was its last run in revenue service before being official retirement from active service. After that, it was stored at the Redondo Junction. In 1958, it was placed on display in San Bernardino.

Restoration
In 1981, the San Bernardino Railroad Historical Society was formed with intentions of restoring and operating 3751. Four years later, it achieved its goal when 3751 was sold to it for one cent with the condition that the SBRHS must restore and operate the locomotive. In 1986, 3751 was moved from its display to California Steel Industries, where it was restored at a cost of $1.50 million. On August 13, 1991, it moved under its own steam for the first time in thirty-eight years. It made its first excursion run on December 27, 1991, running with two Santa Fe EMD FP45s and 16 passenger cars on a four-day trip from Los Angeles via Barstow to Bakersfield. Since then, it has been utilized for a large number of excursions and special trips, and for display at many events.

Excursion service

1991 to 2000 
The locomotive is currently owned by the San Bernardino Railroad Historical Society, the same organization that performed the initial 1986 restoration.

In August 1992, the 3751 was found on its largest assignment so far, as the engine ran the entire route of Santa Fe's Transcon route between Los Angeles and Chicago with three (and later two) Santa Fe GE Dash 8-40CWs. This run would include travelling to Topeka, Kansas to attend that year's Topeka Railroad days, where the locomotive was briefly displayed near Union Pacific 4-6-6-4 No. 3985.

On April 22–23, 1995, 3751 was displayed in the Riverside Sunkist Orange Blossom Festival in Riverside. On December 31, 1996 when Atchison, Topeka & Santa Fe merged with Burlington Northern Railroad to form Burlington Northern Santa Fe, the locomotive retained the same number. The excursion was operated again on April 20–21, 1996.

In June 1999, the locomotive participated in Railfair 99. On the way to the fair, 3751 ran with a BNSF GE Dash 9-44CW and a passenger train mixed with a boxcar train from Los Angeles to Sacramento via San Bernardino, Barstow, Bakersfield, and Stockton.

2000 to 2010 
In October 2000, 3751 was listed on the National Register of Historic Places, much like sister engine No. 3759.

The locomotive has been displayed at Fullerton Railroad Days in Fullerton, California a number of times.

In August 2002, the 3751 ran an Amtrak excursion from Los Angeles to Williams, Arizona to participate in the 2002 National Railway Historical Society Convention. The excursion ran over Metrolink, BNSF Railway, and Arizona and California Railroad tracks. The engine also ran on the Grand Canyon Railway for an excursion on the former Santa Fe's Grand Canyon line. The event including double and tripleheading with the Grand Canyon Railway's own steam engines, ex-Chicago Burlington & Quincy 2-8-2 4960 and ex-Lake Superior & Ishpeming 2-8-0 18. There was a night photo session that took place which featured the three locomotives side-by-side.

2010 to present 
In May 2010, the locomotive returned to the Surf Line for a third excursion from Los Angeles to San Diego, pulling eight Amtrak cars and a few dome cars, attracting large crowds. In order to alleviate issues with turning the train, the excursion was split over two days: south to San Diego on May 1, and north to Los Angeles the following day. This proved successful, as 3751 was on time into San Diego the first day and sustained only normal delays northbound, thus proving the excursion to be the most successful yet. The weekend after the trip to San Diego saw the engine in San Bernardino for National Train Day and the 2010 San Bernardino Railroad Days festival. It has made annual runs to San Bernardino for the Railroad Days Festival in April or May since the initial trip.

In May 2012, 3751 powered a six-day excursion from Los Angeles to Williams, Arizona to celebrate the state's Centennial. As part of the excursion, another special round-trip doubleheader to the Grand Canyon and back was run with 3751 and GCRY 4960. The train also operated over the Arizona & California Railroad on the way to Williams and on the return trip to Los Angeles. Three weeks before the trip to Arizona,  the engine also made the trip east to attend the San Bernardino Railroad Days Festival for the third year in a row.

In May 2013, 3751 ran on a fourth trip to the San Bernardino Railroad Days Festival.

In May 2015, 3751 made an appearance at Fullerton Railroad Days 2015 in Fullerton, California, making it the first time since 2008 to appear at this event. From April 30 - May 1, 2016, the loco was on display again and left Fullerton 2 hours late due to traffic. From May 6–7, 2017, she was on display yet again for the last time for a few years as she went into a 3-4 year restoration. She was on display at Union Station's Summer Train Fest on July 15, 2017 before being overhauled. 3751's overhaul was estimated to be completed in 2021, and on August 10 of that same year, No. 3751 was test fired right before the 30th anniversary of the locomotives' first return to steam, as well as the 40th anniversary of the SBRHS. In March-April 2022, No. 3751 was equipped with the new Positive train control (PTC) system. Afterwards, on September 24 and 25, 2022, No. 3751 participated in the Amtrak Track Safety community event at the Fullerton Transportation Center.

Surviving sister engines
 3759 is displayed at Locomotive Park in Kingman, Arizona.
 3768 is displayed at Great Plains Transportation Museum in Wichita, Kansas.
 2903 is displayed at the Illinois Railway Museum in Union, Illinois. 
 2912 is displayed at the Pueblo Railway Museum in Pueblo, Colorado.
 2913 is displayed at Riverview Park in Fort Madison, Iowa.
 2921 is displayed at the Modesto Amtrak Station in Modesto, California.
 2925 is displayed at the California State Railroad Museum in Sacramento, California.
 2926 moved from Coronado Park in Albuquerque, New Mexico in 1999 to the New Mexico Steam Locomotive and Railroad Historical Society; then moved again for restoration to operating condition, which was completed in 2021.

Historic designations 
 National Register of Historic Places #NPS–#00001178

See also
 List of Registered Historic Places in Los Angeles
 Santa Fe 1316
 Santa Fe 3415
 Grand Canyon Railway 29
 Southern Pacific 2479
 Southern Pacific 4449
 Union Pacific 844

References

External links 

 San Bernardino Railroad Historical Society official website

3751
Baldwin locomotives
4-8-4 locomotives
Individual locomotives of the United States
National Register of Historic Places in Los Angeles
Railway locomotives on the National Register of Historic Places
Railway locomotives introduced in 1927
Rail transportation on the National Register of Historic Places in California
Standard gauge locomotives of the United States
Preserved steam locomotives of California